The United States Special Presidential Envoy for Compact Negotiations is a dedicated diplomatic position created by the Biden White House in 2022 to negotiate amendments to the Compact of Free Association (COFA), the agreement governing the relationship between the United States and the Freely Associated States (FAS) of Micronesia, the Marshall Islands, and Palau. It is currently held by Ambassador Joseph Yun.

History 
The three strategically important Pacific nations have been affiliated with the United States since the U.N. made them part of the U.S.-governed Trust Territory of the Pacific Islands in 1947. They achieved full sovereignty in 1986, when the U.S. Congress ratified the COFA, providing the FAS with economic benefits and visa-free entry to any U.S. jurisdiction in exchange for full international defense authority and responsibilities.  The initial terms ran to 2003, followed by an amended agreement guaranteeing permanent financial assistance through 2023.

Negotiations to extend the compacts became stalled in December 2020. In February 2022 the Republic of the Marshall Islands' Ambassador to the United States, Gerald Zackios, attributed the impasse to Washington's failure to appoint a negotiator empowered by the president to discuss key issues beyond economic assistance, including remuneration for the legacy of nuclear testing on the islands, the continuing presence of U.S. military bases and the ballistic missile test site at Kwajalein Atoll and climate-change mitigation. Citing "the critical nature of these complex negotiations," U.S. Secretary of State Antony Blinken announced the creation of the position of Special Presidential Envoy for Compact Negotiations on March 22, 2022, President Biden named Ambassador Yun to be the inaugural envoy.

References 

 
Executive Office of the President of the United States
2022 establishments in the United States
Presidency of Joe Biden